Dubičiai is a village in , Varėna district municipality, Alytus County, southeastern Lithuania. According to the 2001 census, the village has a population of 388 people. At the 2011 census, the population was 291.

Dubičiai village is located c.  from Varėna,  from Marcinkonys,  from Mantotai (the nearest settlement),  from the Belarusian border.

References

Villages in Varėna District Municipality